Azovstal was a railway station in Mariupol, Ukraine. It was named after Metallurgical Combine Azovstal. Nowadays, Highway M14 is located above the place where the station previously was.

References 

Railway stations in Donetsk Oblast
Defunct railway stations